Concepción Sofía Robles Altamirano (born 15 May 1965) is a Mexican politician affiliated with the Institutional Revolutionary Party. As of 2014 she served as Deputy of the LIX Legislature of the Mexican Congress representing Oaxaca as replacement of Jacobo Sánchez López.

References

1965 births
Living people
People from Oaxaca
Women members of the Chamber of Deputies (Mexico)
Institutional Revolutionary Party politicians
Deputies of the LIX Legislature of Mexico
Members of the Chamber of Deputies (Mexico) for Oaxaca